The Purple Riders is a 1922 American silent Western film serial directed by William Bertram and starring Elinor Field, Ernest Shields and Charles Dudley.

Cast
 Joe Ryan as Sheriff Dick Ranger
 Elinor Field as Betty Marsh
 Ernest Shields as Gerald Marsh
 Walter Rodgers as Stephen Marsh
 Charles Dudley as'Doc' Dreamer
 Maude Emory as Red Feather
 Joe Rickson as Rudolph Myers

References

Bibliography
 Connelly, Robert B. The Silents: Silent Feature Films, 1910-36, Volume 40, Issue 2. December Press, 1998.
 Munden, Kenneth White. The American Film Institute Catalog of Motion Pictures Produced in the United States, Part 1. University of California Press, 1997.

External links
 

1922 films
1922 Western (genre) films
1920s English-language films
American silent serial films
Silent American Western (genre) films
American black-and-white films
Films directed by William Bertram
Vitagraph Studios films
1920s American films